Jonny is a masculine given name, and pet name, in the English language. A pet form of Jon, the natural diminutive of given name Jonathan, in some cases it can also mean a condom. A variant form of Jonny is Jonnie.

People with the name
Jonny (footballer) (born 1994), Spanish footballer currently playing for Wolves
Jonny Buckland (born 1977), English musician and guitarist for the band Coldplay
Jonny Clayton (born 1974), Welsh professional darts player
Jonny Craig (born 1986), Canadian-American singer-songwriter
Jonny Evans (born 1988), Northern Irish footballer currently playing for Leicester City F.C.
Jonny Greenwood (born 1971), English musician and guitarist for the band Radiohead
Jonny Hector (born 1964), Swedish chess Grandmaster
Jonny Howson (born 1988), English footballer currently playing for Middlesbrough F.C.
Jonny Kim (born 1984), American navy lieutenant, physician, and astronaut
Jonny Lang (born 1981), American blues rock singer-songwriter and guitarist
Jonny Lee Miller (born 1972), British-American actor
Jonny Wilkinson (born 1979), English rugby player
Jonny Bairstow (born 1989), English cricketer
Jonny Harris (born 1975), Canadian actor and comedian

Fictional characters
Jonny, an Ed, Edd n Eddy character
The title character of Jonny Quest

References

English masculine given names
English-language masculine given names